Corna Mara is a mountain of Lombardy, Italy, It has an elevation of 2807 metres.

Mountains of the Alps
Mountains of Lombardy